Partula radiolata, common name the radiolate partula or Guam streaked tree snail, is a species of air-breathing tropical land snail, a terrestrial pulmonate gastropod mollusk in the family Partulidae. This species is endemic to Guam.

References

radiolata
Fauna of Guam
Taxonomy articles created by Polbot
ESA endangered species
Gastropods described in 1846